Ali Nazer or Ali Nazar may refer to:
 Ali Nazer, Khuzestan
 Ali Nazar, West Azerbaijan